Milanofiori Forum is a station on Line 2 of the Milan Metro, in the southern suburb of Assago. The line here runs beside Autostrada A7, and it is the southernmost station of the network. The station was opened on 20 February 2011 as the terminus of a two-station extension from Famagosta.

The station serves the nearby Assago Forum, an indoor arena. The station can get very crowded after concerts and other events at the Forum.

References

Line 2 (Milan Metro) stations
Railway stations opened in 2011
2011 establishments in Italy
Railway stations in Italy opened in the 21st century